Virtual Nightmare is a 2000 made-for-TV horror film directed by Michael Pattinson and starring Michael Muhney, Tasma Walton, and Todd MacDonald. It was loosely based on the Frederik Pohl short story The Tunnel under the World.

Plot
In the future the world has seemingly reached perfection. Dale Hunter, a junior advertising executive, begins to question the nature of his reality when he is in a car accident and glitches start to appear in his vision. Seeking help from the local librarian, Wendy, the two discover that there are many things about their world, and indeed their lives, that do not hold up to close scrutiny. Dale makes repeated attempts to escape from the confines of the world he has known, with varying results.

Reception
John Ferguson of the Radio Times remarked “There are shades of The Matrix in this modest but rewarding sci-fi thriller.”

See also
 List of television films produced for UPN

References

External links 
 
 Virtual Nightmare at Screen Australia
 ‎Virtual Nightmare (2000) directed by Michael Pattinson • Reviews, film + cast • Letterboxd

2000 television films
2000 films
2000 horror films
2000 science fiction films
2000s English-language films
2000s American films
2000s science fiction horror films
American horror television films
American science fiction horror films
American science fiction television films
UPN original films